Linapacan, officially the Municipality of Linapacan,  is a 5th class municipality in the province of Palawan, Philippines. According to the 2020 census, it has a population of 16,424 people.

History
When the Spaniards came in the 16th century, they made a fortress called Caseledan Port and Eli Port to be able to protect against Moro raiders.

In 1954, the 10 islands of Barangonan, Cabunlawan, Calibangbangan, Decabaitot, Maroyogroyog, Nangalao, New Calaylayan, Pical, San Miguel, and San Nicolas were separated from Coron to form the town of Linapacan. The municipality of Culion is between Linapacan and Coron.

In October 2013, the website Daily News Dig proclaimed the waters of Linapacan Island so clear that the website put it on the top of their list of 35 waters to swim in around the world before one dies.

Geography

Barangays
Linapacan is politically subdivided into 10 island barangays.
 Barangonan (Iloc)
 Cabunlawan
 Calibangbangan
 Decabaitot
 Maroyogroyog
 Nangalao
 New Culaylayan
 Pical
 San Miguel (Poblacion)
 San Nicolas

Climate

Demographics

Economy

See also

 List of islands of the Philippines

References

External links
Linapacan Profile at PhilAtlas.com
[ Philippine Standard Geographic Code]
Philippine Census Information
Local Governance Performance Management System

Municipalities of Palawan
Islands of Palawan
Island municipalities in the Philippines